Raja Ram Yadav (born 4 January 1957) is a professor of Physics worked at University of Allahabad and former vice-chancellor of Veer Bahadur Singh Purvanchal University.

Education and career
Yadav did his B.Sc., M.Sc. and PhD from University of Allahabad in 1977, 1979 and 1988 respectively. He served as a Geophysicist (Wells) in Oil and Natural Gas Commission Government of India from 1983 to 1988 then he resigned from ONGC and became RSS Pracharak from 1988 to 1992. Since July 1992, he started his teaching career as a lecturer of Mahatma Gandhi Chitrakoot Gramoday Vishwavidyalaya in 1992. He joined University of Allahabad in 1996 as an associate professor and became a professor in 2004 there. In 2017 he was named as vice chancellor of Veer Bahadur Singh Purvanchal University, a post he served till 2020. He is currently serving as Head of the historic and glorious Department of Physics in the University of Allahabad.

References

External links
Info
 Module

Living people
Heads of universities and colleges in India
University of Allahabad alumni
Scientists from Uttar Pradesh
1957 births